Castilleja ambigua is a species of Indian paintbrush known by the common name Johnny-nip.   It is native to western North America from British Columbia to California, where it is most common along the coast in salt marshes and scrub.

Description
This is a highly variable annual herb growing to a maximum height near 30 centimeters. The leaves are 1 to 5 centimeters long and lobed or not. The inflorescence is up to 12 centimeters long and a few wide. It is packed with bracts that have white to light purple ridged tips. Between the bracts emerge the lobed flowers, which are yellow to light purple or rose. The fruit is a capsule about a centimeter long.

Subspecies
There are three subspecies, two of which are endemic to California.

The Humboldt Bay owl's clover, Castilleja ambigua ssp. humboldtiensis, is considered a threatened plant in Northern California.

External links
Jepson Manual Treatment: Castilleja ambigua
Castilleja ambigua Photo gallery

ambigua
Flora of California
Flora of British Columbia
Flora of Oregon
Flora of Washington (state)
Natural history of the California chaparral and woodlands
Natural history of the California Coast Ranges
Taxa named by William Jackson Hooker
Flora without expected TNC conservation status